The 2014–15 FA Vase Final was the 41st final of the Football Association's cup competition for teams at levels 9-11 of the English football league system. The match was contested between North Shields, of the Northern League Division 1 (level 9), and Glossop North End, of the North West Counties League Premier Division (level 9). North Shields won the final 2-1 after extra time.

Route to the Final
With a maximum of 9 rounds needed to reach the Final, North Shields played in every round. They played five away ties and three home ties plus the semi-final round, winning each round without need of a replay. Glossop on the other hand only played in seven of the rounds, receiving a bye into the First Round Proper. They were drawn with four away ties and two home ties, although both later rounds required a replay to decide the winner.

This was North Shields' first visit to Wembley since 1969 when they won the FA Amateur Cup final.  In comparison, Glossop were visiting the home of football for the second time in six years, having lost the 2009 FA Vase Final to another Northern League team, Whitley Bay.

Build up
After a meeting at Wembley Stadium the week after the semi-finals, where both teams met with The Football Association to decide the choice of dressing rooms, the kit selections and TV rights, tickets for the final were released on sale on 1 April 2015, with Glossop and North Shields expecting to sell thousands of tickets compared with an average home crowds of 340 and 322 respectively.

In the week before the final, Glossop trained at Everton's Finch Farm on the Sunday and at Arsenal's Training Centre on the Friday before the final.  Glossop set up a club shop in their town to sell Wembley merchandise.

Match

Details

References

FA Vase Finals
FA Vase Final
FA Vase Final
Events at Wembley Stadium
FA Vase Final